The Director of the National Reconnaissance Office (DNRO) of the United States is responsible to the Secretary of Defense (through the Under Secretary of Defense for Intelligence) and the Director of National Intelligence for all national space and assigned airborne reconnaissance activities. The DNRO provides top-level management direction to the NRO in response to Secretary of Defense and Director of National Intelligence requirements.

Chronological list of National Reconnaissance Office directors
This is a list of directors of the NRO, and the terms in office.

List of Deputy Directors of National Reconnaissance Office

See also
 Under Secretary of the Air Force

References

National Reconnaissance Office Directors